The Longstaff Peaks are a series of high peaks standing just west of Davidson Glacier in the north-central part of the Holland Range in Antarctica. They were discovered by the British National Antarctic Expedition (1901–04), and named Mount Longstaff for Llewellyn Wood Longstaff, a principal contributor to the expedition. The descriptive term was amended by the New Zealand Antarctic Place-Names Committee.

References

Mountains of the Ross Dependency
Shackleton Coast